Evarcha proszynskii is a species of jumping spider in the family Salticidae. It is found from Russia to Japan, and in the western United States and Canada.

References

Further reading

External links

 

Salticidae
Articles created by Qbugbot
Spiders described in 1998